Kevin J. McCarra (1 February 1958 – 24 October 2020) was a Scottish sportswriter.

Biography
McCarra was educated at Glasgow University, receiving a MA (Hons) degree. McCarra was married to Susan Stewart.

He was chief football correspondent for The Guardian newspaper. He often appeared on the Guardian Podcast Football Weekly hosted by James Richardson. He also worked for Scotland on Sunday, The Sunday Times and The Times, and appeared on BBC Radio Scotland's "Good Morning Scotland" as a newspaper reviewer.

He died from Alzheimer's disease on 24 October 2020, aged 62.

Works
Official Scotland World Cup Supporters' Book (1998)
One Afternoon in Lisbon (1988)
One Hundred Cups: Story of the Scottish Cup (1985)
Scottish Football: Pictorial History from 1867 to the Present Day (1984)

Notes 

1958 births
2020 deaths
20th-century Scottish writers
20th-century British journalists
The Guardian journalists
Scottish sportswriters
Scottish podcasters
Alumni of the University of Glasgow
Deaths from Alzheimer's disease
Deaths from dementia in Scotland
BBC Scotland newsreaders and journalists